Sumikawa is a Japanese surname. Notable people with the surname include:

, Japanese footballer
, Japanese actress and voice actress

See also
Sumikawa Station, a railway station in Minami-ku, Sapporo, Hokkaido Prefecture, Japan

Japanese-language surnames